KF Dukagjini (Klubi Futbollistik Dukagjini Klinë) is a professional football club based in the city of Klina, Kosovo. The club compete in the top tier of football in Kosovo the Football Superleague of Kosovo.

Players

Current squad

Other players under contract

Out on loan

Historical list of coaches

 Xhengis Rexhepi (20 Jun 2019 - 27 Oct 2019)
 Severin Elezaj (28 Oct 2019 - 6 Oct 2020)
 Armend Dallku (8 Oct 2020 -)

Honours

Notes and references

Notes

References

Football clubs in Kosovo
Klina
Association football clubs established in 1958
1958 establishments in Yugoslavia